James Meadows Rendel may refer to:
James Meadows Rendel (engineer) (1799–1856), British civil engineer
James Meadows Rendel (geneticist) (1915–2001), Australian geneticist